Neolechia is a genus of moths in the family Gelechiidae. It contains the species Neolechia gamma, which is found in New Guinea.

References

Gelechiinae